The 1990 Omloop Het Volk was the 44th edition of the Omloop Het Volk cycle race and was held on 3 March 1990. The race started and finished in Sint-Amandsberg. The race was won by Johan Capiot.

General classification

References

1990
Omloop Het Nieuwsblad
Omloop Het Nieuwsblad
March 1990 sports events in Europe